The Men's Shot Put event at the 2005 World Championships in Athletics was held at the Helsinki Olympic Stadium on August 6.

Medalists

Schedule
All times are Eastern European Time (UTC+2)

Abbreviations
All results shown are in metres

Records

Results

Qualifying

Group A
Christian Cantwell, United States 21.11 Q
Joachim Olsen, Denmark 20.85 Q
Adam Nelson, United States 20.35 Q
Tepa Reinikainen, Finland 20.19 q
Tomasz Majewski, Poland 20.19 q
Carl Myerscough, Great Britain 20.07 q
Gheorghe Guset, Romania 19.83
Manuel Martínez, Spain 19.55
Petr Stehlik, Czech Republic 19.48
Miran Vodovnik, Slovenia 19.28
Ivan Yushkov, Russia 18.98
Marco Antonio Verni, Chile 18.60
Dorian Scott, Jamaica 18.33
Andrey Mikhnevich, Belarus 20.54 Q, DQ
Shaka Sola, Samoa DNS

Group B
Ralf Bartels, Germany 20.56 Q
Mikulas Konopka, Slovakia 20.39 Q
Rutger Smith, Netherlands 20.26 Q
Ville Tiisanoja, Finland 20.18 q
Khaled Habash Al-Suwaidi, Qatar 19.72
Anton Lyuboslavskiy, Russia 19.56
John Godina, United States 19.54
Dragan Peric, Serbia and Montenegro 19.46
Taavi Peetre, Estonia 19.20
Yuriy Belov, Belarus 19.16
Hamza Alic, Bosnia and Herzegovina 18.77
Edis Elkasevic, Croatia 18.59
Janus Robberts, South Africa NM
Pavel Lyzhyn, Belarus NM
Yuriy Bilonoh, Ukraine 20.21 q, DQ

Final
Adam Nelson, United States 21.73 (SB)
Rutger Smith, Netherlands 21.29
Ralf Bartels, Germany 20.99
Christian Cantwell, United States 20.87
Joachim Olsen, Denmark 20.73
Ville Tiisanoja, Finland 20.57
Tomasz Majewski, Poland 20.23
Tepa Reinikainen, Finland 20.09
Mikuláš Konopka, Slovakia 19.72
Carl Myerscough, Great Britain 19.67
Yuriy Bilonoh, Ukraine 20.89 DQ
Andrey Mikhnevich, Belarus 20.74 DQ

See also
 2005 Shot Put Year Ranking

References

External links
IAAF results, qualification
IAAF results, final

Shot put
Shot put at the World Athletics Championships